Year 1082 (MLXXXII) was a common year starting on Saturday (link will display the full calendar) of the Julian calendar.

Events

By place

Byzantine Empire 
 Spring – The Normans under Duke Robert Guiscard take Dyrrhachium (modern-day Durrës) in Illyria and advance inland, capturing most of Macedonia and Thessaly. Robert is forced to leave Greece to deal with an uprising in Italy. He leaves his son Bohemond in charge of the army, who lays siege to the city of Larissa. Emperor Alexios I mobilizes a new army, and with the support of 7,000 Seljuk Turks he clears Thessaly from the Normans.
 Byzantine–Venetian treaty: Alexios I signs a trade and defence pact with Venice, in the form of an imperial Golden Bull. He grants the Venetians a commercial colony in Constantinople, as well as free trading and exemption from taxes, throughout the Byzantine Empire in return for their defense of the Adriatic Sea against the Normans.

Europe 
 May 12 – Battle of Mailberg: Duke Vratislaus II of Bohemia invades Austria with an army of 8,000 men (supported by mercenaries from Moravia and Bavaria). He defeats the forces under Margrave Leopold II (the Fair) near Mailberg. The northern region of Lower Austria is devastated from pillage and famine.
 December 6 – Count Ramon Berenguer II of Barcelona is killed while hunting in the woods. He is succeeded by his twin brother Berenguer Ramon II as the sole ruler of Catalonia (modern Spain).
 Winter – Emperor Henry IV leads an expedition into Italy and besieges Rome. He gains entry; a synod is agreed upon by the Romans, to rule on the dispute between Henry and Pope Gregory VII.
 Adalbero, margrave of Styria, is forced to resign in favor of his brother Ottokar II, who is an ally of Gregory VII.
 The first mention of the town of Hofgeismar (modern Germany) is recorded.

Asia 
 The Korean printing of the entire Buddhism Tripitaka is completed (approximate date).

By topic

Religion 
 Construction of the Rochester Cathedral is completed in England.

Births 
 June 7 – Hui Zong, emperor of the Song Dynasty (d. 1135)
 November 11 – Ramon Berenguer III, count of Barcelona (d. 1132)
 Goswin of Anchin, French Benedictine monk and abbot (d. 1165)
 Mary of Scotland, countess of Boulogne (d. 1116)
 Minamoto no Yoshikuni, Japanese samurai (d. 1155)
 Muhammad I (Tapar), sultan of the Seljuk Empire (d. 1118)
 Petronilla of Lorraine, countess and regent of Holland (d. 1144)
 Theotonius of Coimbra, Portuguese royal advisor (d. 1162)
 Ulrich of Attems, Italian nobleman (approximate date)
 Yaropolk II Vladimirovich, Grand Prince of Kiev (d. 1139)

Deaths 
 December 5 – Ramon Berenguer II, count of Barcelona
 Arsen Ninotsmindeli, Georgian bishop and calligrapher
 Bolesław II (the Generous), king of Poland (or 1081)
 David of Munktorp, English Cluniac monk and abbot
 Lothair Udo II, margrave of the Nordmark 
 Waleran I (or Walram), count of Arlon and Limburg

References